Tarvin was, from 1894 to 1974, a rural district in the administrative county of Cheshire, England. The district was named after the village of Tarvin, and saw considerable boundary changes throughout its life.

Creation
The district was created by the Local Government Act 1894 as the successor to Tarvin Rural Sanitary District. It initially consisted of the following civil parishes:

1936 boundary changes
In 1936 the boundaries of the rural district were substantially altered under a county review order. It lost large parts to Chester Rural District, but also absorbed most of the disbanded Malpas Rural District.
 (Aldford, Barrow, Buerton, Churton by Aldford, Churton Heath, Guilden Sutton, Huntington, Lea Newbold, Rowton, and Saighton) passed to Chester RD
 to Nantwich Rural District
 to Hoole Urban District
 were received from Malpas RD.

The following parishes were added to the district:

Abolition
The Local Government Act 1972 completely reorganised council boundaries throughout England and Wales. On 1 April 1974 Tarvin Rural District was merged with the city and county borough of Chester and the Chester Rural District to form the new non-metropolitan district of Chester.

References

History of Cheshire
Districts of England abolished by the Local Government Act 1972
Districts of England created by the Local Government Act 1894
Rural districts of England